Craigie is a northern suburb of Perth. Craigie was chosen as a suburb name in 1970 and honours an early councillor of the City of Wanneroo who did work in developing the City. Craigie is one of the four "Whitfords" suburbs that resulted from the State Government rezoning a large area of coastal land for development in 1969.

The suburb once had a senior high school, Craigie Senior High School, which was opened in 1976 only to be closed again in 2003 following a decline in student enrolments. Students were shifted into Padbury Senior High School or Belridge Senior High School. Padbury itself closed in 2011.

References

Suburbs of Perth, Western Australia
Suburbs in the City of Joondalup